The Long Absence ("Such a long absence") is a 1961 French film directed by Henri Colpi. It tells the story of Therese (Alida Valli), a Puteaux café owner mourning the mysterious disappearance of her husband sixteen years earlier. A tramp arrives in the town and she believes him to be her husband.  But he is suffering from amnesia and she tries to bring back his memory of earlier times.

The Long Absence shared the Palme d'Or prize with the Luis Buñuel film Viridiana at the 1961 Cannes Film Festival.

Plot
Sixteen years after the end of World War II, Thérèse Langlois owns a pub in Puteaux, Paris. Wrapping up the season, she plans her annual vacation in Chaulieu with her lover, but is growing emotionally distant towards him. At the pub, a tramp walks by daily singing The Barber of Seville aria and other opera songs. Intrigued, Thérèse has her bartender Martine call the tramp in for a drink. The tramp, who says he lives by the river, reveals he is suffering from amnesia but carries identification indicating his name is Robert Landais. After the tramp leaves, Thérèse follows the tramp to the river and studies his face and movements; she becomes convinced he is in fact her long-lost husband Albert Langlois.

Determined to make the tramp remember his past identity, Thérèse brings Albert's aunt Alice to the pub, along with Albert's nephew. While the tramp is sitting at another table, the three Langlois loudly recount Albert's story; During the war Albert had been arrested by the French police in Chaulieu in June 1944 and turned over to the Gestapo in Angers, and spent time in a camp with his friend Aldo Ganbini. Thérèse herself (née Ganbini) was originally from Chaulieu but stayed in Puteaux, they recount. The tramp leaves the pub without acknowledging himself as Albert. Alice discloses to Thérèse she did not recognize the tramp and that she believes he is not a physical match for Albert, also pointing out Albert had no knowledge of the opera. Thérèse disagrees, arguing Albert could have learned the songs while imprisoned with Aldo.

Thérèse ends her relationship with her lover. She meets with the tramp for dinner, after which they dance. The tramp still does not indicate he remembers anything about a past life as Albert. As the tramp leaves, Thérèse loudly calls out the name Albert Langlois and other friends join in. Overwhelmed, the tramp stops, raises his hands in a pose of surrender, and flees. As he runs, he narrowly avoids a traffic accident. Thérèse's friends tell her the tramp is unharmed but that he is gone, and try to persuade her to give up on bringing his memories back. Thérèse is unconvinced by them, deciding that it will be easier to try to restore the tramp's memories in the upcoming winter season.

Cast

Reception
In 2016, The Hollywood Reporter ranked the film 68th among 69 counted winners of the Palme d'Or to date, judging it forgettable.

The Japanese filmmaker Akira Kurosawa cited this movie as one of his 100 favorite films.

Accolades
The Long Absence shared the Palme d'Or prize with the Luis Buñuel film Viridiana at the 1961 Cannes Film Festival.

References

External links

 
Cannes profile

1961 films
Palme d'Or winners
1960s French-language films
1961 drama films
French black-and-white films
Louis Delluc Prize winners
Films directed by Henri Colpi
Films scored by Georges Delerue
Films about amnesia
Films about homelessness
Films about veterans
Films set in Paris